Pablo Ocampo Street, also known simply as Ocampo Street and formerly and still referred to as Vito Cruz Street, is an inner city main road in Manila, Philippines. It runs west–east for about  connecting the southern districts of Malate and San Andres southeast to the adjacent city of Makati.

Originally called Vito Cruz Street after Hermógenes Vito Cruz, the 19th century mayor of Pineda (present-day Pasay), the street was renamed in 1989 in honor of the Filipino statesman and lawyer Pablo Ocampo. Its section in south central Malate was known as Calle Lico and Calle Connor, respectively, when it was then a short street in the district before extending towards the Manila South Cemetery.

The Manila section runs from Roxas Boulevard near the Cultural Center of the Philippines Complex heading east through the city's southern limits in Malate district. It crosses Harrison Avenue and Taft Avenue, passing beneath LRT Line 1. From there, it continues for another kilometer past the Singalong area and southwestern San Andres district toward Osmeña Highway. Upon entering Makati east of Osmeña Highway, the road turns east at Kamagong Street where it becomes Ocampo Extension or Vito Cruz Extension. It passes through barangays La Paz, San Antonio, and Santa Cruz in northwestern Makati until it meets its eastern terminus at South Avenue, west of the Manila South Cemetery. The street carries two-way traffic, except for its section from Taft to Arellano Avenues that carries one-way eastbound traffic and from Arellano Avenue to Chino Roces Avenue that carries one-way westbound traffic.

Pablo Ocampo Street is served by the Vito Cruz LRT Station along Taft Avenue and the Vito Cruz railway station along Osmeña Highway. It also extends into the Bay City area west of Roxas Boulevard as Pedro Bukaneg Street.

Landmarks

Pablo Ocampo Street is the site of the Rizal Memorial Sports Complex with the art deco-style Rizal Memorial Baseball Stadium fronting the intersection with Adriatico Street, and the Rizal Memorial Coliseum just behind it. On the opposite corner of Adriatico is Century Park Hotel and Harrison Plaza, one of Manila's first modern shopping centers. Across the street from the plaza is the Embassy of Vietnam, Fo Guang Shan Mabuhay Temple and Orchid Garden Suites. The street also hosts the Bangko Sentral ng Pilipinas headquarters at the junction with Roxas Boulevard where Legaspi Towers 300 is also located. Near the intersection with Taft Avenue stand several condominium towers, such as the Cityland Vito Cruz Towers and Torre Lorenzo.

The street also provides access to the De La Salle University and De La Salle–College of Saint Benilde campuses located just north of the intersection with Taft Avenue. Arellano University School of Law is also accessible via Donada Street, a street connected to Vito Cruz. It is also the site of Saint Scholastica's College and School of Arts and Design of De La Salle–College of Saint Benilde, which houses the Museum of Contemporary Art and Design. In the San Andres and Makati areas east of Osmeña Highway, the street hosts the Rafael Palma Elementary School, Kingswood Towers, Savana Market, Shopwise Makati, the relocated Mapúa University Makati Campus, and the Manila South Cemetery at its terminus.

See also
 Major roads in Manila
 List of renamed streets in Manila

References

Streets in Manila
Malate, Manila
San Andres, Manila